Dresden is an abandoned village in Brazeau Township in Perry County, Missouri, United States.

Etymology

Dresden was named after Dresden in Saxony, Germany, the city where Pastor Martin Stephan's church was located and where his movement had originated.

History 

Dresden was a short-lived town near Altenburg, one of the seven colonies established in 1839 in the Saxon Migration. Pastor Carl Frederick Wilhelm Walter ministered to the village of Dresden.

A log-cabin Lutheran seminary “college” was founded in 1839 at Dresden by J. F. Bürger, T. Brohm, O. Fuerbringer, and Walther; classes, however, soon moved to Altenburg. Most of Dresden's inhabitants came from Dresden, Germany. After Stephan's downfall, it was assigned for a time to the care of Walther, but most of the other pastors lived there because it contained most of the habitable dwellings of the first Saxon settlers. It must have immediately adjoined Altenburg, probably on the south, because the "special partition" between them for a while was unfixed, and in 1841, when Walther left to take over his brother's church in St. Louis, it was made a subsidiary parish or branch of Altenburg. This probably marked its end as an independent settlement. The famous log cabin erected for the college in 1839 is originally said to have been located within the territory of Dresden, but is subsequently always spoken of as Altenburg, where it is proudly exhibited today.

References 

Abandoned villages in Perry County, Missouri
German-American culture in Missouri